Harry Burns may refer to:

People
Harry Burns (activist) (1922–2000), US civil rights leader
Harry Burns (doctor) (born 1951), former Chief Medical Officer for Scotland
Harry Burns (film) (1882–1939), silent film director and actor, Hollywood trade magazine editor, married Dorothy Vernon

Characters
Harry Burns, a character played by Billy Crystal in the 1989 film When Harry Met Sally...
Harry Burns, character in Harry's Girls

See also
Harold Burns (disambiguation)
Harry Burns Hutchins (1847–1930), president of the University of Michigan, 1909–1920
Henry Burns (disambiguation)
Harry Byrne (disambiguation)